Turkey Tayac, legally Philip Sheridan Proctor (1895–1978), was a Piscataway leader and herbal medicine practitioner; he was notable in Native American activism for tribal and cultural revival in the 20th century. He had some knowledge of the Piscataway language and was consulted by the Algonquian linguist, Ives Goddard, as well as Julian Granberry.

Career
Proctor was a Native American activist who had served during World War I and also worked for the Internal Revenue Service. His activism spanned many decades.

Background
A combination of factors had influenced the descendants of the Piscataway and other tribes in the Southeast. The tribe had been decimated by the early 18th century by infectious disease, and warfare with other tribes and the colonists. They had lost their land through colonial encroachment. Their last mention in historical records was at a 1793 conference in Detroit. Remaining Piscataway in Maryland merged with other tribes; others intermarried with both white and black neighbors and assimilated to various degrees.

The legacy of slavery and the post-Reconstruction environment had led to 19th-century legislation across the South creating racial segregation and more rigid binary classifications of society into "white" and "black"—the latter essentially meaning all other. With states' enforcement of the "one-drop rule" (carried to extremes in Virginia), anyone with discernible African ancestry was classified as "negro," "mulatto," or "black," thereby discounting any other ancestry. Although a few families identified as Piscataway Indians into the early 20th century, prevailing racist attitudes tended to classify mixed-race people as black. Throughout most of the 19th century, the US census had no provision for classification of Indians. Census takers might classify them as free people of color, or mulatto, or black. The loss of information about Native American individuals added to the perception that the tribes and people had faded away.

Maryland dissolved the Native American reservations it had assigned in the 18th century. State and federal census records classified the Piscataway and any mixed-race people as "free negro" or "mulatto", adding to the breakdown of identity. While the Piscataway were enumerated as "mulattoes" in state and federal census records, Catholic parish records and ethnographic reports continued to identify certain families as Indian.

In the 20th century, social scientists studied the "We-sorts" (also known as Wesorts) to see if there were remnants of Native American culture. They were so distinct as a group that they sat together in the local Catholic Church, between the whites and the blacks, in a time of public segregation. Recognizing their unique heritage and the fact that some communities had married within to maintain cultural identity, sociologists called such groups "tri-racial isolates", identifying numerous such communities across the South.

Rise to leadership
Turkey Tayac fought in World War I in France as a part of the Rainbow Division, originally made up of National Guard units to mobilize quickly. He was nearly killed by mustard gas.

In 1911, in an article on the Piscataway tribe, the Catholic Encyclopedia noted that the few contemporary people who claimed to be Piscataway were "negro mongrels". This was an indication of how prominently the society used race to define identity; under racial segregation and application of the "one-drop rule", the states defined being of African descent as overriding  other ancestry in the binary system.

Turkey Tayac was a notable figure in the early and mid-20th century cultural revitalization movements among remnant Southeastern Native American communities, including the Lumbee, Nanticoke, and Powhatan Indians of the Atlantic coastal plain. Their efforts were curtailed by the Great Depression and World War II.

Following the passage of the federal Indian Reorganization Act, many federally recognized tribes have established blood quantum laws and other requirements for membership. They frequently relate to proving direct descent from individuals identified as Native in certain official records.

Turkey Tayac started using a new name as he organized a movement for Native American peoples that privileged self-ascriptive forms of identification. In one of their projects in the 1960s, the Piscataway issued identification cards to Native Americans, rather than have tribes apply to and rely on state and federal bureaucracies to issue them on their behalf.

Cultural reclamation
Along with his tribal responsibilities, Turkey Tayac was also an active participant in the Bonus Army, part of his dedication to seeking social justice. Turkey Tayac was a Roman Catholic throughout his life, and was active in the Catholic Veterans of America.

Turkey Tayac was interviewed by ethnographers, including T. Dale Stewart, John Harrington, Frank G. Speck, William H. Gilbert, and Lucille St. Hoyme—who studied evidence for Native American survival in regions where it was thought that Native Americans had long since vanished.

Turkey Tayac was particularly concerned with Moyaone, also called the Accokeek Creek Site. The archeological site shows indigenous human habitation from about 1300 CE to 1630 CE, including the time of the historic Piscataway. It was designated a National Historic Landmark in 1966 and is located within Piscataway Park, part of the National Park system administered by the National Park Service. Some of the land had been purchased in 1928 by Alice and Henry G. Ferguson from Philip Proctor's mother and her second husband, after his father had died.

After Alice died in 1951, Henry established the Alice Ferguson Foundation to protect the environment.  In the 1960s, the Foundation made plans to donate much of the property to the National Park Service for protection. It is across the Potomac River from Mt. Vernon. Other property, known as the Hard Bargain Farm, is run by the Alice Ferguson Foundation.

Tayac supported the formation in the 1960s of Piscataway National Park.  The rise of the American Indian Movement in the 1970s increased interest in Turkey Tayac's attempts to reorganize the tribe. Along with his son Billy Redwing Tayac and Avery Lewis, a Pima supporter, in 1974 Turkey Tayac incorporated a non-profit organization, the "Piscataway-Conoy Indians."

Eventually, the Piscataway-Conoy Indians, Inc. opened the Piscataway Indian Center. They wanted to use it as a place to revitalize American Indian identity for people of Piscataway heritage, and for others of Native American descent in the region.

In 1978, Turkey Tayac was diagnosed with leukemia. His family worked with Congressional and Senate representatives to gain permission for Proctor to be buried at the park. Senator Paul Sarbanes attached an amendment to unrelated legislation to achieve this. It was opposed by the Alice Ferguson Foundation, which had donated land for the park. In 1979, Turkey Tayac was buried in the ossuary site at Moyaone.

Since 1978, the Piscataway have divided into three organized groups, strong enough to take different directions. On Monday, January 9, 2012, all three groups were granted recognition by the state of Maryland. None has yet been recognized officially by the federal government.

References

Feest, Christian. "Nanticokes and Neighboring Tribes", in Handbook of North American Indians, Volume 15, 1978.
Maryland Commission on Indian Affairs, Correspondence with R. Christopher Goodwin, August 12, 1999.
Maynor, Malinda. Native American Identity in the Segregated South: The Indians of Robeson County, North Carolina, 1872-1956., Doctoral Dissertation, Chapel Hill: University of North Carolina, 2005.
Rountree, Helen C. Pocahontas's People: The Powhatan Indians of Virginia through Four Centuries, Norman: University of Oklahoma Press, 1990.
Rountree, Helen C., and Thomas E. Davidson. Eastern Shore Indians of Virginia and Maryland. Charlottesville: University of Virginia Press, 1997.
Tayac, Gabrielle. "Stolen Spirits," in Contemporary Issues in American Indian Studies, ed. Dane Morrison. Lang Publishers, 1997.
__. To Speak with One Voice: Supra-Tribal American Indian Collective Identity Incorporation among the Piscataway, 1500-1998, Doctoral Dissertation. Cambridge, MA: Harvard University, 1999.
__. "Keeping the Original Instructions," in Native Universe, ed. Clifford Trafzer and Gerald McMaster. Washington, DC: National Geographic and the National Museum of the American Indian, 2004.
__. "We Rise, We Fall, We Rise," in Smithsonian Magazine, September 2004.
__. "From the Deep," in New Tribe, New York, ed. Gerald McMaster. Washington, DC: National Museum of the American Indian, 2005.
__. Oral & Documented history of the Southern Maryland Outcase, [ Allie Dragoni ] 2003

External links
Piscataway Indian Nation home page
"Piscataway", Catholic Encyclopedia

1895 births
1978 deaths
20th-century Native Americans
American military personnel of World War I
Deaths from leukemia
Herbalists
Native American leaders
Native American United States military personnel
People from Charles County, Maryland
Piscataway people